Venice is a studio album by Austrian electronic music producer and guitarist Fennesz, released on 23 March 2004 on Touch. A 10th anniversary edition was released in 2014, adding one track ("The Future Will Be Different") to the beginning and another track ("Tree") to the end of the track listing.

Critical reception

At Metacritic, which assigns a weighted average score out of 100 to reviews from mainstream critics, Venice received an average score of 82 based on 14 reviews, indicating "universal acclaim".

Pitchfork named Venice the 21st best album of 2004.

Track listing

Personnel
 Christian Fennesz – guitar, production
 Burkhard Stangl – guitar (on "Circassian" and "Laguna")
 David Sylvian – lyrics and vocals (on "Transit")

References

External links
 

2004 albums
Fennesz albums
Touch Music albums